The Men's 200 metre butterfly competition of the 2014 European Aquatics Championships was held on 20–21 August.

Records
Prior to the competition, the existing world, European and championship records were as follows.

Results

Heats
The heats were held at 09:30.

Semifinals
The semifinals were held at 19:01.

Semifinal 1

Semifinal 2

Final
The final was held at 19:02.

References

Men's 200 Metre Butterfly